The Masonic Hall in Smithland, Kentucky (also known as The Second Baptist Church), is a historic building constructed in 1860 and listed on the National Register of Historic Places in 1998.  It was originally constructed as a meeting hall for the local Masonic lodges (who continued to meet in the building until the 1960s). During the American Civil War it was used by the Federal Government as a Commissary office and store house.  The basement of the building was occupied by the First Baptist Church from 1887 to 1913.  The Masons sold the building in the 1960s and it became a restaurant.  Since 1980, it has housed the Second Baptist (Mission) Church.

References

Clubhouses on the National Register of Historic Places in Kentucky
Former Masonic buildings in Kentucky
National Register of Historic Places in Livingston County, Kentucky
1860 establishments in Kentucky
Cultural infrastructure completed in 1860
Masonic buildings completed in the 19th century
Baptist churches in Kentucky
Smithland, Kentucky